Eristalinus taeniops is a species of hoverfly, also known as the band-eyed drone fly.

Distribution
This species is present in part of Europe (Albania, Balearic Islands, Bulgaria, the Canary Islands, Cyprus, France, Greece, Italy, Malta, North Macedonia, Poland, Portugal, Spain), in North Africa, in the Near East (Turkey, Lebanon, Israel), in the Caucasus, in the Eastern parts of Afrotropical realm to South Africa, in the Oriental realm (Nepal, Northern India), in Northern Pakistan and in Iran. It has been introduced to parts of North America (California and Florida). Recently this species has been discovered in Rio de Janeiro, Poços de Caldas, Brazil, and Nova Maringá, Brazil.

Habitat
These hoverflies can be found in Holly oak forests, in forest clearings, maquis, rivers, streams, and in coastal marshes.

Description
These hoverflies exhibit a bee-like yellow and black coloration (Batesian mimicry) and are often mistaken for wasps or bees. The thorax has a metallic yellow-brown color and it is densely yellow hairy. Also the scutellum are yellow-brown colored. The abdomen is reddish-yellow, with transversal black bands. The compound eyes have five distinct, vertical, dark stripes. The wings are transparent, usually yellowish-brown at the base, while the halteres are brightly pale yellow colored.

Biology
Adults of these hoverflies can be found from April to October with a peak from May to August. They feed on nectar of yellow and white flowers such as Erica, Daphne, Senecio and Rosaceae species. The larvae live as rat-tailed maggots, mainly in the mud, in animal carcasses and in water contaminated by pig manure.

Gallery

Bibliography
Joachim & Hiroko Haupt: Fliegen und Mücken: Beobachtung, Lebensweise. Naturbuch-Verlag, Augsburg 1998, .
Ricarte, Antonio & M. Á. Marcos-García. 2017. A checklist of the Syrphidae (Diptera) of Spain, Andorra and Gibraltar. Zootaxa 4216(5): 401–440
Speight, M.C.D. (2014) Species accounts of European Syrphidae (Diptera), 2014. Syrph the Net, the database of European Syrphidae, vol. 78, 321 pp., Syrph the Net publications, Dublin.
 Celeste Pérez Bañón, Santos Rojo, Gunilla Ståhls and M. Angeles Marcos-García – Taxonomy of European Eristalinus (Diptera: Syrphidae) based on larval morphology and molecular data

References

External links 
 Photos of Californian specimens

Diptera of Europe
Diptera of Asia
Diptera of Africa
Eristalinae
Insects described in 1818